Yeronga railway station is located on the Beenleigh line in Queensland, Australia. It serves the Brisbane suburb of Yeronga.

In September 1930, the standard gauge New South Wales North Coast line opened to the west of the station. In 1995, as part of the construction of the Gold Coast line, the standard gauge line was converted to dual gauge.

Services
Yeronga station is served by all stops Beenleigh line services from Beenleigh, Kuraby and Coopers Plains to Bowen Hills and Ferny Grove.

Until June 2011, Yeronga was also served by services to Corinda via the Yeerongpilly-Corinda line.

Cross River Rail 
As a part of Cross River Rail, Yeronga and 7 other stations will be rebuilt. As a result, there is a bus service (Bus route 109) that operates from Boggo Road (Park Road Station) to Moorooka Train Station to supplement the closing of the stations and to alleviate congestion. The new station will have lifts and better accessibility and is expected to reopen on 28 March. It will add a new 3rd platform and the new footbridge will go over the road, connecting up to local stores.

Services by platform

References

External links

Yeronga station Queensland's Railways on the Internet
[ Yeronga station] TransLink travel information

Railway stations in Brisbane